Simon Rademan (born Simon Petrus Rademan, on 22 February 1964), is a South African fashion designer and stylist. As couturier, and Published Author, he is well known for his contribution to South African style and etiquette.

Early history

Simon Rademan was born in Ceres, in the then Cape Province of South Africa, in 1964. Both his parents were deaf, so he learned sign language before he could speak either Afrikaans or English. He matriculated at the Charlie Hofmeyr High school, and completed two years of military conscription in Pretoria in the then Transvaal Province. He worked as a bank-clerk for five years and made his mark as an actor, radio artist and performer. Simon Rademan took part-time studies in Art, Graphic art, Make-up, Hairstyling, Modelling and Paint Techniques, he enrolled at the International Academy of Fashion in Gauteng.

Career

He enrolled at the International Academy of Fashion in Pretoria to study Fashion design and received his Diploma in Haute Couture and majored in Pattern Design, Textiles and Creative Styling. He was the recipient of many awards: Student of the year – 1989, The woolboard - 1989, Young Designer Award - 1990, Most innovative Designer – 1992. Sanlam and Volksblad Designer Award – 1993.

His lecturing in design, millinery, etiquette, modelling and beading has shaped and moulded the ideas of a generation of young designers. Simon Rademan went on to register The Simon Rademan Fashion Design Studio, a design house that is today widely recognized for excellent craftsmanship and true style. He was also afforded the prestigious opportunity to be the designer for the FIFA draw, and is known as amongst the top of design. At his coming of age in the industry in 2010, he was already considered a legend and an icon in the South African fashion industry.

Mr Rademan has been awarded the elite honour of becoming the official South African member of the first ever "International Designer Collection".  This Symbol of Global Unity took place during 2011 Rugby World Cup, and was hosted by the Prime Minister of New Zealand, Rt Hon John Key, and Style Pasifika, with 19 other countries, including… France, Canada, Japan, Argentina, England, Scotland, Romania, Ireland, Australia, United States of America, Italy, Russia and Wales.

As a talent scout

Simon Rademan has been involved in nationwide searches, scouting for numerous competitions, including the very prestigious, Miss South Africa, Mr South Africa, Mrs South Africa, Fashion Television.

As a philanthropist

His involvement in charities and for causes such as organ donation, Red Cross War Memorial Children's Hospital, cancer, the deaf, epilepsy, missing children and animal rights are eloquent expression of his care and concern for society’s vulnerable.

As a published Author

On 4 November 2013, The Style Bible hits the shelves. Published by Zebra Press, Random House Struik, it is the first guide book on style to focus specifically on South African Women.

External links 
Random House Struik
The Style Bible
 
Article -Rapport, a national Afrikaans Sunday newspaper
Banquet with President Nelson Mandela's wife
Elite of Global Design
A Master turns 21!
The International Designer Collection
Judge at Miss South Africa 2002
Rt Hon John Key invites the World's best
Design inspiration
Designers save the day
Fashion best meets Rugby best - Rugby World Cup 2011

1964 births
Living people
People from Ceres, Western Cape
South African fashion designers
Fashion stylists